Mount Isa Inlier, an interim Australian bioregion, is located in the Queensland, and comprises .

The bioregion has the code MII. There are three subregions.

See also

Geography of Australia

References

Further reading
 Thackway, R and I D Cresswell (1995) An interim biogeographic regionalisation for Australia : a framework for setting priorities in the National Reserves System Cooperative Program Version 4.0 Canberra : Australian Nature Conservation Agency, Reserve Systems Unit, 1995. 

Biogeography of Queensland
IBRA regions